Bernhard Gröschel (19 June 1939 – 4 October 2009) was a German linguist and slavist.

Biography
Bernhard Gröschel studied Slavic Studies, General Linguistics, Phonetics and Communication Studies at the University of Bonn. In 1967 he received his Ph.D. in Bonn and continued to work there as a researcher and lecturer. From 1977 to 2004 he worked at the Department of General Linguistics at the University of Münster.

Gröschel is best known for his book Das Serbokroatische zwischen Linguistik und Politik (Serbo-Croatian between Linguistics and Politics).

Selected publications
 Die Sprache Ivan Vyšenśkyjs: Untersuchungen und Materialien zur historischen Grammatik des Ukrainischen. Slavistische Forschungen, Bd. 13 (in German). Köln and Wien: Böhlau Verlag. 1972, p. 384. .
 Materialistische Sprachwissenschaft. Pragmalinguistik, Bd. 15 (in German). Weinheim and Basel: Verlagsgruppe Beltz. 1978, p. 239. .
 Sprachnorm, Sprachplanung und Sprachpflege. Studium Sprachwissenschaft, Bd. 6 (in German). Münster: Institut für Allgemeine Sprachwissenschaft der Westfälischen Wilhelms-Universität. 1982, p. 232.
 (with Elena Parwanowa) Russisch-deutsches Wörterbuch der linguistischen Terminologie: Band 1 und 2. Studium Sprachwissenschaft, Beiheft 3 (in German). Münster: Institut für Allgemeine Sprachwissenschaft der Westfälischen Wilhelms-Universität, 1985, p. 935.
 Die Presse Oberschlesiens von den Anfängen bis zum Jahre 1945: Dokumentation und Strukturbeschreibung. Schriften der Stiftung Haus Oberschlesien: Landeskundliche Reihe, Bd. 4 (in German). Berlin: Gebr. Mann. 1993, p. 447. .
 Studien und Materialien zur oberschlesischen Tendenzpublizistik des 19. und 20. Jahrhunderts. Schriften der Stiftung Haus Oberschlesien: Landeskundliche Reihe, Bd. 5 (in German). Berlin: Gebr. Mann, 1993, p. 219. .
 Themen und Tendenzen in Schlagzeilen der Kattowitzer Zeitung und des Oberschlesischen Kuriers 1925 - 1939: Analyse der Berichterstattung zur Lage der deutschen Minderheit in Ostoberschlesien. Schriften der Stiftung Haus Oberschlesien: Landeskundliche Reihe, Bd. 6 (in German). Berlin: Gebr. Mann, 1993, p. 188. .
 (with Clemens-Peter Herbermann and Ulrich Hermann Waßner) Sprache & Sprachen: Teil 1: Fachsystematik der allgemeinen Sprachwissenschaft und Sprachensystematik ; mit ausführlichen Terminologie- und Namenregistern (in German). Wiesbaden: Harrassowitz Verlag, 1997, p. 630. .
 (with Clemens-Peter Herbermann and Ulrich Hermann Waßner) Sprache & Sprachen: Teil 2: Thesaurus zur allgemeinen Sprachwissenschaft und Sprachenthesaurus (in German). Wiesbaden: Harrassowitz Verlag, 2002, p. 389. .
  Contents.

See also

 Ausbausprache
 Dialect continuum
 Differences between Serbo-Croatian standard varieties
 Folk linguistics
 Language secessionism in Serbo-Croatian
 Mutual intelligibility
 Serbo-Croatian language
 Standard language
 Shtokavian dialect

Further reading
 Kordić, Snježana (2010). Review of the Book Das Serbokroatische zwischen Linguistik und Politik. Zeitschrift für Balkanologie (in German) (Wiesbaden) 46 (2): 305–309.
 Keipert, Helmut (2010). Review of the Book Das Serbokroatische zwischen Linguistik und Politik. Osteuropa (in German) (Stuttgart) 60 (9): 155–157.
 Bunčić, Daniel (2010). Review of the Book Das Serbokroatische zwischen Linguistik und Politik. Zeitschrift für Slavische Philologie (in German) (Heidelberg) 67 (1): 244–250.

External links

 
 
 Biography of Bernhard Gröschel taken from his last book 
 
 
 
 
 
 
 Works by Bernhard Gröschel on The LINGUIST List
 Works by Bernhard Gröschel at HathiTrust

Slavists
Linguists from Germany
German people of German Bohemian descent
University of Bonn alumni
Academic staff of the University of Bonn
Academic staff of the University of Münster
Sociolinguists
Terminologists
20th-century linguists
21st-century linguists
Sudeten German people
1939 births
2009 deaths
20th-century lexicographers